Krzysztof Ossoliński (28 April, 1587 – 24 February, 1645) was a Polish–Lithuanian szlachcic (nobleman).

He was Podstoli of Sandomierz since 1618, Podkomorzy of Sandomierz since 1619, Castellan sadecki in 1633, wojnicki in 1636, voivode of Sandomierz Voivodeship in 1638, Starost stobnicki, ropczycki and wolbromski.

Brother of Kanclerz (Chancellor) Jerzy Ossoliński, important figure in the contemporary politics of the Polish–Lithuanian Commonwealth.

He was the builder of Krzyżtopór, a baroque castle that was reduced to ruin during the Swedish invasion of 1655.

1587 births
1645 deaths
Krzysztof
Members of the Sejm of the Polish–Lithuanian Commonwealth